Frol Romanovich Kozlov (– 30 January 1965) was a Soviet politician. Hero of Socialist Labour (1961).

Biography
Kozlov was born in the village of Loshchinino, Kasimovsky Uyezd of Ryazan Governorate. Between 1953 and 1957, Kozlov was the first secretary of the Leningrad Oblast CPSU Committee. He was elected a candidate member of the Presidium (as the Politburo of the Central Committee of the Communist Party of the Soviet Union was then called) on 14 February 1957 and served as a full member from 29 June 1957 until he was relieved of his duties on 16 November 1964, following the ousting of his mentor, Nikita Khrushchev, a month earlier.

In July 1959, he visited the secretive Bohemian Grove encampment in northern California.

For many years, he was considered Khrushchev's likely successor but even before his mentor's removal from office, Kozlov's position had been undermined by the effects of his alcoholism; in the spring of 1963 he was replaced by Leonid Brezhnev as Secretary of the Communist Party Central Committee. At the time of his removal, Kozlov had already suffered a stroke, and he died shortly after his removal from office. In 1992, he was deemed partly responsible for the June 1962 Novocherkassk massacre.

His ashes were buried in the Kremlin Wall Necropolis.

Decorations and awards
 Hero of Socialist Labour
 Four Orders of Lenin
 Order of the Patriotic War, 2nd class
 Order of the Red Banner of Labour, twice
 Order of the Red Star

References

External links
Biography of Frol Kozlov 

1908 births
1965 deaths
People from Kasimovsky Uyezd
Governors of Saint Petersburg
Heads of government of the Russian Soviet Federative Socialist Republic
Peter the Great St. Petersburg Polytechnic University alumni
Politburo of the Central Committee of the Communist Party of the Soviet Union members
Secretariat of the Central Committee of the Communist Party of the Soviet Union members
Third convocation members of the Supreme Soviet of the Soviet Union
Fourth convocation members of the Supreme Soviet of the Soviet Union
Fifth convocation members of the Supreme Soviet of the Soviet Union
Sixth convocation members of the Supreme Soviet of the Soviet Union
Members of the Supreme Soviet of the Russian Soviet Federative Socialist Republic, 1955–1959
Members of the Supreme Soviet of the Russian Soviet Federative Socialist Republic, 1959–1963
Members of the Supreme Soviet of the Russian Soviet Federative Socialist Republic, 1963–1967
Heroes of Socialist Labour
Recipients of the Order of Lenin
Recipients of the Order of the Red Banner of Labour
Recipients of the Order of the Red Star
Russian communists
Burials at the Kremlin Wall Necropolis